Rhode Island (like road) is a state in the New England region of the Northeastern United States. It is the smallest U.S. state by area and the seventh-least populous, with slightly less than 1.1 million residents as of 2020; but Rhode Island has grown at every decennial count since 1790 and is the second-most densely populated state, after New Jersey. The state takes its name from the eponymous island, though nearly all of its land area is on the mainland. Rhode Island borders Connecticut to its west; Massachusetts to its north and east; and the Atlantic Ocean to its south via Rhode Island Sound and Block Island Sound; and shares a small maritime border with New York, east of Long Island. Providence is its capital and most populous city.

Native Americans lived around Narragansett Bay for thousands of years before English settlers began arriving in the early 17th century. Rhode Island was unique among the Thirteen British Colonies in having been founded by a refugee, Roger Williams, who fled religious persecution in the Massachusetts Bay Colony to establish a haven for religious liberty. He founded Providence in 1636 on land purchased from local tribes, thereby creating the first settlement in North America with an explicitly secular government. The Colony of Rhode Island and Providence Plantations subsequently became a destination for religious and political dissenters and social outcasts, earning it the moniker "Rogue's Island".

Rhode Island was the first colony to call for a Continental Congress, which it did in 1774, and the first to renounce its allegiance to the British Crown, which it did on May 4, 1776. After the American Revolution, during which it was heavily occupied and contested, Rhode Island became the fourth state to ratify the Articles of Confederation, which it did on February 9, 1778. Because certain of its citizens favored a weaker central government, it boycotted the 1787 convention that had drafted the United States Constitution, which it initially refused to ratify; it finally did ratify it on May 29, 1790, the last of the original 13 states to do so.

It had been officially named the State of Rhode Island and Providence Plantations since the colonial era, but came to be commonly known as "Rhode Island". In November 2020, the state's voters approved an amendment to the state constitution formally dropping "and Providence Plantations" from its full name. Its official nickname is the "Ocean State", a reference to its 400 miles (640 km) of coastline and the large bays and inlets that make up about 14% of its total area.

Name

Origins of the name
Despite its name, most of Rhode Island is on the mainland of the United States. Prior to 2020, its official name was State of Rhode Island and Providence Plantations, derived from the merger of Colonial settlements around Narragansett bay, and outside the jurisdiction of Plymouth colony. The settlements of Rhode Island (Newport and Portsmouth) were on what is commonly called Aquidneck Island today but was called Rhode Island in Colonial times. Providence Plantations referred to settlements on the mainland including Providence and what would become Warwick.

It is unclear how the island came to be named Rhode Island, but two historical events may have been influential:

 Explorer Giovanni da Verrazzano noted the presence of an island near the mouth of Narragansett Bay in 1524 which he likened to the island of Rhodes off the coast of Greece. Subsequent European explorers were unable to precisely identify the island Verrazzano described, but the colonists who settled the area assumed it was this island.
 Adriaen Block passed by the island during his expeditions in the 1610s, and he described it in a 1625 account of his travels as "an island of reddish appearance", which was "een rodlich Eylande" in 17th-century Dutch, meaning a red or reddish island, supposedly evolving into the designation Rhode Island. Historians have theorized this "reddish appearance" resulted from either red autumn foliage or red clay on portions of the shore.

The earliest documented use of the name "Rhode Island" for Aquidneck was in 1637 by Roger Williams. The name was officially applied to the island in 1644 with these words: "Aquethneck shall be henceforth called the Isle of Rodes or Rhode-Island." The name "Isle of Rodes" is used in a legal document as late as 1646. Dutch maps as early as 1659 call the island "Red Island" (Roodt Eylandt).

Changes to the name
The first English settlement in Rhode Island was the town of Providence, which the Narragansett granted to Roger Williams in 1636. At that time, Williams obtained no permission from the English crown, as he believed the English had no legitimate claim on Narragansett and Wampanoag territory. Williams traveled to London in 1643, during the English Civil War, to obtain legal recognition of the new settlements. A Patent was granted to "the incorporation of Providence Plantations in Narragansett Bay in New England” by the Parliamentary committee on Foreign Plantations. After the English Civil war, a Royal Charter was granted in 1663, giving the colony an official name of the "Governor and Company of the English Colony of Rhode Island and Providence Plantations, in New England, in America." Following the American Revolution, in 1790 the new state incorporated as the "State of Rhode Island and Providence Plantations". However, as matter of convenience, the state came to be commonly known as simply "Rhode Island".

The word plantation in the state's name became a contested issue during the 20th century and the increased awareness of slavery and its role in early Rhode Island history. The General Assembly voted in 2009 to hold a referendum in November 2010 on removing "and Providence Plantations" from the official name. Advocates for excising plantation argued that the word symbolized a legacy of disenfranchisement for many Rhode Islanders, as well as the proliferation of slavery in the colonies and in the post-colonial United States. Advocates for retaining the name argued that plantation was simply an archaic synonym for colony and bore no relation to slavery. The people voted overwhelmingly (78% to 22%) to retain the entire original name.

In June 2020, State Senator Harold Metts introduced a resolution for another ballot referendum on the subject, saying, "Whatever the meaning of the term 'plantations' in the context of Rhode Island's history, it carries a horrific connotation when considering the tragic and racist history of our nation." Governor Gina Raimondo issued an executive order to remove the phrase from a range of official documents and state websites. In July, amidst the George Floyd protests and nationwide calls to address systemic racism, the resolution referring the question to the voters was passed by both houses of the Rhode Island General Assembly: 69–1 in the House of Representatives, and 35–0 in the Senate. The change was then approved by voters 52.8% to 47.2% as part of the 2020 United States elections, taking effect in November 2020 upon certification of the results.

History

Colonial era: 1636–1770

In 1636, Roger Williams was banished from the Massachusetts Bay Colony for his religious views, and he settled at the top of Narragansett Bay on land sold or given to him by Narragansett sachem Canonicus. He named the site Providence, "having a sense of God's merciful providence unto me in my distress", and it became a place of religious freedom where all were welcome.

In 1638 (after conferring with Williams), Anne Hutchinson, William Coddington, John Clarke, Philip Sherman, and other religious dissenters were allowed to settle on Aquidneck Island (also known as Rhode Island), by the Narragansett Sachems Canonicus and Miantonomi. They were given a few items in reciprocity for their generosity. However, as Roger Williams made clear in a letter to John Winthrop in June 1638: “Sir, concerning the islands Prudence and…Aquedenick…neither of them were sold properly, for a thousand fathom would not have bought either, by strangers. The truth is, not a penny was demanded for either, and what was paid was only gratuity, though I chose, for better assurance and form, to call it sale.” This settlement was first called Pocasset and then changed in 1639 to Portsmouth. The town was governed by the Portsmouth Compact. The island's southern part became the separate settlement of Newport after disagreements among the founders.

Samuel Gorton purchased lands at Shawomet in 1642 from the Narragansetts, precipitating a dispute with the Massachusetts Bay Colony. In 1644, Providence, Portsmouth, and Newport united for their common independence as the Colony of Rhode Island and Providence Plantations, governed by an elected council and "president". Gorton received a separate charter for his settlement in 1648 which he named Warwick after his patron.

Metacomet was the Wampanoag tribe's war leader, whom the colonists called King Philip. They invaded and burned down several of the towns in the area during King Philip's War (1675–1676), including Providence which was attacked twice. A force of Massachusetts, Connecticut, and Plymouth militia under General Josiah Winslow invaded and destroyed the fortified Narragansett Indian village in the Great Swamp in South Kingstown, Rhode Island on December 19, 1675. In one of the final actions of the war, an Indian associated with Benjamin Church killed King Philip in Bristol, Rhode Island.

The colony was amalgamated into the Dominion of New England in 1686, as King James II attempted to enforce royal authority over the autonomous colonies in British North America, but the colony regained its independence under the Royal Charter after the Glorious Revolution of 1688. Slaves were introduced in Rhode Island at this time, although there is no record of any law legalizing slave-holding. The colony later prospered under the slave trade, distilling rum to sell in Africa as part of a profitable triangular trade in slaves and sugar with the Caribbean. Rhode Island's legislative body passed an act in 1652 abolishing the holding of slaves (the first British colony to do so), but this edict was never enforced and Rhode Island continued to be heavily involved in the slave trade during the post-revolution era. In 1774, the slave population of Rhode Island was 6.3% of the total (nearly twice the ratio of other New England colonies).

Brown University was founded in 1764 as the College in the British Colony of Rhode Island and Providence Plantations. It was one of nine Colonial colleges granted charters before the American Revolution but was the first college in America to accept students regardless of religious affiliation.

Revolutionary to Civil War period: 1770–1860

Rhode Island's tradition of independence and dissent gave it a prominent role in the American Revolution. At approximately 2 a.m. on June 10, 1772, a band of Providence residents attacked the grounded revenue schooner HMS Gaspée, burning it to the waterline for enforcing unpopular trade regulations within Narragansett Bay. Rhode Island was the first of the thirteen colonies to renounce its allegiance to the British Crown on May 4, 1776. It was also the last of the thirteen colonies to ratify the United States Constitution on May 29, 1790, and only under threat of heavy trade tariffs from the other former colonies and after assurances were made that a Bill of Rights would become part of the Constitution.

During the Revolution, the British occupied Newport in December 1776. A combined Franco-American force fought to drive them off Aquidneck Island. Portsmouth was the site of the first African-American military unit, the 1st Rhode Island Regiment, to fight for the U.S. in the unsuccessful Battle of Rhode Island of August 29, 1778. A month earlier, the appearance of a French fleet off Newport caused the British to scuttle some of their own ships in an attempt to block the harbor. The British abandoned Newport in October 1779, concentrating their forces in New York City. An expedition of 5,500 French troops under Count Rochambeau arrived in Newport by sea on July 10, 1780. The celebrated march to Yorktown, Virginia, in 1781 ended with the defeat of the British at the Siege of Yorktown and the Battle of the Chesapeake.

Rhode Island was also heavily involved in the Industrial Revolution, which began in America in 1787 when Thomas Somers reproduced textile machine plans which he imported from England. He helped to produce the Beverly Cotton Manufactory, in which Moses Brown of Providence took an interest. Moses Brown teamed up with Samuel Slater and helped to create the second cotton mill in America, a water-powered textile mill. The Industrial Revolution moved large numbers of workers into the cities, creating a permanently landless class who were, therefore, by the law of the time, also voteless. By 1829, 60% of the state's free white males were ineligible to vote. Several attempts were unsuccessfully made to address this problem, and a new state constitution was passed in 1843 allowing landless men to vote if they could pay a $1 poll tax.

For the first several decades of statehood, Rhode Island was governed in accordance with the 1663 colonial charter. Voting rights were restricted to landowners holding at least $134 in property, disenfranchising well over half of the state's male citizens. The charter apportioned legislative seats equally among the state's towns, over-representing rural areas and under-representing the growing industrial centers. Additionally, the charter disallowed landless citizens from filing civil suits without endorsement from a landowner. Bills were periodically introduced in the legislature to expand suffrage, but they were invariably defeated. In 1841, activists led by Thomas W. Dorr organized an extralegal convention to draft a state constitution, arguing the charter government violated the Guarantee Clause in Article Four, Section Four of the United States Constitution. In 1849 in Luther v. Borden the US Supreme Court declined to rule on this question, holding that it was a political question outside its jurisdiction. In 1842, the charter government and Dorr's supporters held separate elections, and two rival governments claimed sovereignty over the state. Dorr's supporters led an armed rebellion against the charter government, and Dorr was arrested and imprisoned for treason against the state. Later that year, the legislature drafted a state constitution, removing property requirements for American-born citizens but keeping them in place for immigrants, and retaining urban under-representation in the legislature.

In the early 19th century, Rhode Island was subject to a tuberculosis outbreak which led to public hysteria about vampirism.

Civil War

During the American Civil War, Rhode Island was the first Union state to send troops in response to President Lincoln's request for help from the states. Rhode Island furnished 25,236 fighting men, of whom 1,685 died. On the home front, Rhode Island and the other northern states used their industrial capacity to supply the Union Army with the materials it needed to win the war. The United States Naval Academy moved to Rhode Island temporarily during the war.

In 1866, Rhode Island abolished racial segregation in the public schools throughout the state.

Gilded Age

The 50 years following the Civil War were a time of prosperity and affluence that author William G. McLoughlin calls "Rhode Island's halcyon era". Rhode Island was a center of the Gilded Age and provided a home or summer home to many of the country's most prominent industrialists. This was a time of growth in textile mills and manufacturing and brought an influx of immigrants to fill those jobs, bringing population growth and urbanization. In Newport, New York's wealthiest industrialists created a summer haven to socialize and build grand mansions. Thousands of French-Canadian, Italian, Irish, and Portuguese immigrants arrived to fill jobs in the textile and manufacturing mills in Providence, Pawtucket, Central Falls, and Woonsocket.

World War I
During World War I, Rhode Island furnished 28,817 soldiers, of whom 612 died. After the war, the state was hit hard by the Spanish Influenza.

In the 1920s and 1930s, rural Rhode Island saw a surge in Ku Klux Klan membership, largely in reaction to large waves of immigrants moving to the state. The Klan is believed to be responsible for burning the Watchman Industrial School in Scituate, which was a school for African-American children.

Growth in the modern era: 1929–present
Since the Great Depression, the Rhode Island Democratic Party has dominated local politics. Rhode Island has comprehensive health insurance for low-income children and a large social safety net. Many urban areas still have a high rate of children in poverty. Due to an influx of residents from Boston, increasing housing costs have resulted in more homelessness in Rhode Island.

The 350th Anniversary of the founding of Rhode Island was celebrated with a free concert held on the tarmac of the Quonset State Airport on August 31, 1986. Performers included Chuck Berry, Tommy James, and headliner Bob Hope.

In 2003, a nightclub fire in West Warwick claimed 100 lives and resulted in nearly twice as many injured, catching national attention. The fire resulted in criminal sentences.

In March 2010, areas of the state received record flooding due to rising rivers from heavy rain. The first period of rainy weather in mid-March caused localized flooding and, two weeks later, more rain caused more widespread flooding in many towns, especially south of Providence. Rain totals on March 29–30, 2010 exceeded 14 inches (35.5 cm) in many locales, resulting in the inundation of area rivers—especially the Pawtuxet River which runs through central Rhode Island. In addition, it flooded two shopping malls, numerous businesses, and many homes in the towns of Warwick, West Warwick, Cranston, and Westerly. Amtrak service was also suspended between New York and Boston during this period. Following the flood, Rhode Island was in a state of emergency for two days. The Federal Emergency Management Agency (FEMA) was called in to help flood victims.

Geography

Rhode Island covers an area of  within the New England region of the Northeastern United States and is bordered on the north and east by Massachusetts, on the west by Connecticut, and on the south by Rhode Island Sound and the Atlantic Ocean. It shares a narrow maritime border with New York State between Block Island and Long Island.

Rhode Island is nicknamed the Ocean State and has a number of oceanfront beaches. The state has two distinct natural regions. Eastern Rhode Island contains the lowlands of the Narragansett Bay, while Western Rhode Island forms part of the New England upland. Rhode Island's forests are part of the Northeastern coastal forests ecoregion.

Narragansett Bay is a major feature of the state's topography. There are more than 30 islands within the bay; the largest is Aquidneck Island, which holds the municipalities of Newport, Middletown, and Portsmouth. The second-largest island is Conanicut, and the third is Prudence.

A rare type of rock called Cumberlandite is found only in Rhode Island (specifically, in the town of Cumberland) and is the state rock. There were initially two known deposits of the mineral, but it is an ore of iron, and one of the deposits was extensively mined for its ferrous content.

Climate 

Most of Rhode Island has a humid continental climate, with warm summers and cold winters. The state's southern coastal portions are the broad transition zone into subtropical climates, with hot summers and cool winters with a mix of rain and snow. Block Island has an oceanic climate.

Rhode Island is vulnerable to tropical storms and hurricanes due to its location in New England, catching the brunt of many storms that blow up the eastern seaboard. Hurricanes that have done significant damage in the state include the 1938 New England hurricane, Hurricane Carol (1954), Hurricane Donna (1960), and Hurricane Bob (1991).

Cities and towns

Rhode Island is divided into five counties but it has no county governments. The entire state is divided into municipalities, which handle all local government affairs.

There are 39 cities and towns in Rhode Island. Major population centers today result from historical factors; development took place predominantly along the Blackstone, Seekonk, and Providence Rivers with the advent of the water-powered mill. Providence is the base of a large metropolitan area.

The state's 19 largest municipalities ranked by population are :

Providence (190,934)
Cranston (82,934)
Warwick (82,823)
Pawtucket (75,604)
East Providence (47,139)
Woonsocket (43,240)
Cumberland (36,405)
Coventry (35,688)
North Providence (34,114)
South Kingstown (31,931)
West Warwick (31,012)
Johnston (29,568)
North Kingstown (27,732)
Newport (25,163)
Westerly (23,359)
Central Falls (22,583)
Lincoln (22,529)
Bristol (22,493)
Smithfield (22,118)

Some of Rhode Island's cities and towns are further partitioned into villages, in common with many other New England states. Notable villages include Kingston in the town of South Kingstown, which houses the University of Rhode Island; Wickford in the town of North Kingstown, the site of an annual international art festival; and Wakefield where the Town Hall is for the Town of South Kingstown.

Landmarks

The state capitol building is made of white Georgian marble. On top is the world's fourth largest self-supported marble dome. It houses the Rhode Island Charter granted by King Charles II in 1663, the Brown University charter, and other state treasures.

The First Baptist Church of Providence is the oldest Baptist church in the Americas, founded by Roger Williams in 1638.

The first fully automated post office in the country is in Providence. There are many historic mansions in the seaside city of Newport, including The Breakers, Marble House, and Belcourt Castle. Also there is the Touro Synagogue, dedicated on December 2, 1763, considered by locals to be the first synagogue within the United States (see below for information on New York City's claim), and still serving. The synagogue showcases the religious freedoms established by Roger Williams, as well as impressive architecture in a mix of the classic colonial and Sephardic style. The Newport Casino is a National Historic Landmark building complex that houses the International Tennis Hall of Fame and features an active grass-court tennis club.

Scenic Route 1A (known locally as Ocean Road) is in Narragansett. "The Towers" is also in Narragansett featuring a large stone arch. It was once the entrance to a famous Narragansett casino that burned down in 1900. The Towers now serve as an event venue and host the local Chamber of Commerce, which operates a tourist information center.

The Newport Tower has been hypothesized to be of Viking origin, although most experts believe it was a Colonial-era windmill.

Environment

Environmental legislation

On May 29, 2014, Governor Lincoln D. Chafee announced that Rhode Island was one of eight states to release a collaborative Action Plan to put 3.3 million zero-emission vehicles on its roads by 2025. The plan's purpose is to reduce greenhouse gas and smog-causing emissions. The plan promotes zero-emissions vehicles and investments in the infrastructure to support them.

In 2014, Rhode Island received grants of $2,711,685 from the Environmental Protection Agency to clean up Brownfield sites in eight locations. The grants provided communities with funding to assess, clean up, and redevelop contaminated properties, boost local economies, and leverage jobs while protecting public health and the environment.

In 2013, the "Lots of Hope" program was established in the City of Providence to focus on increasing the city's green space and local food production, improve urban neighborhoods, promote healthy lifestyles and improve environmental sustainability. Supported by a $100,000 grant, the program will partner with the City of Providence, the Southside Community Land Trust, and the Rhode Island Foundation to convert city-owned vacant lots into productive urban farms.

In 2012, Rhode Island passed bill S2277/H7412, "An act relating to Health and Safety – Environmental Cleanup Objectives for Schools", informally known as the School Siting Bill. Sponsored by Senator Juan Pichardo and Representative Scott Slater, and signed into law by the governor, it made Rhode Island the first US State to prohibit school construction on Brownfield sites where toxic vapors can potentially affect indoor air quality. It also creates a public participation process whenever a city or town considers building a school on any other kind of contaminated site.

Environmental monitoring
The  monitors invasive weeds throughout New England.

Demographics

The United States Census Bureau estimated Rhode Island's population was 1,059,361 on July 1, 2019, a 0.65% increase since the 2010 United States census. At the 2020 U.S. census, its population was 1,097,379. The center of population of Rhode Island is in Providence County, in the city of Cranston. A corridor of population can be seen from the Providence area, stretching northwest following the Blackstone River to Woonsocket, where 19th-century mills drove industry and development.

According to HUD's 2022 Annual Homeless Assessment Report, there were an estimated 1,577 homeless people in Rhode Island. 

According to the 2010 census, 81.4% of the population was White (76.4% non-Hispanic white), 5.7% was Black or African American, 0.6% American Indian and Alaska Native, 2.9% Asian, 0.1% Native Hawaiian and other Pacific Islander, 3.3% from two or more races. 12.4% of the total population was of Hispanic or Latino origin (they may be of any race).

Of the people residing in Rhode Island, 58.7% were born in Rhode Island, 26.6% were born in a different state, 2.0% were born in Puerto Rico, U.S. Island areas or born abroad to American parent(s), and 12.6% were foreign born.

According to the U.S. Census Bureau, Rhode Island had an estimated population of 1,056,298, which is an increase of 1,125, or 0.10%, from the prior year and an increase of 3,731, or 0.35%, since the year 2010. This includes a natural increase since the last census of 15,220 people (that is 66,973 births minus 51,753 deaths) and an increase due to net migration of 14,001 people into the state. Immigration from outside the United States resulted in a net increase of 18,965 people, and migration within the country produced a net decrease of 4,964 people.

Hispanics in the state make up 12.8% of the population, predominantly Dominican, Puerto Rican, and Guatemalan populations. Rhode Island has the highest percentage of Dominican Americans in the country at 5.1% according to latest estimates, putting the state at sixth largest Dominican community in the country.

According to the 2000 U.S. census, 84% of the population aged 5 and older spoke only American English, while 8.07% spoke Spanish at home, 3.80% Portuguese, 1.96% French, 1.39% Italian and 0.78% speak other languages at home accordingly.

The state's most populous ethnic group, non-Hispanic white, has declined from 96.1% in 1970 to 76.5% in 2011. In 2011, 40.3% of Rhode Island's children under the age of one belonged to racial or ethnic minority groups, meaning they had at least one parent who was not non-Hispanic white.

6.1% of Rhode Island's population were reported as under 5, 23.6% under 18, and 14.5% were 65 or older. Females made up approximately 52% of the population.

According to the 2010–2015 American Community Survey, the largest ancestry groups were Irish (18.3%), Italian (18.0%), English (10.5%), French (10.4%), and Portuguese (9.3%). Rhode Island has some of the highest percentages of Irish Americans and Italian Americans. Italian Americans make up a plurality in central and southern Providence County and French-Canadian Americans form a large part of northern Providence County. Irish Americans have a strong presence in Newport and Kent counties. Americans of English ancestry still have a presence in the state as well, especially in Washington County, and are often referred to as "Swamp Yankees".

Rhode Island has a notable Lusophone community, having a higher percentage of Americans of Portuguese ancestry than any other state, including Portuguese Americans and Cape Verdean Americans. Additionally, the state also has the highest percentage of Liberian immigrants, with more than 15,000 residing in the state. African immigrants, including those from Cape Verde and Liberia, form significant and growing communities in Rhode Island. Rhode Island is one of the few states where Black people of recent foreign origin outnumber Black people of multigenerational American origin (African Americans). Rhode Island also has a sizable Asian community.

Although Rhode Island has the smallest land area of all 50 states, it has the second highest population density of any state in the Union, second to that of New Jersey.

Birth data

Since 2016, data for births of White Hispanic origin are not collected, but included in one Hispanic group; persons of Hispanic origin may be of any race.

Religion

A Pew survey of Rhode Island residents' religious self-identification in 2014 showed the following distribution of affiliations: Catholic 42%, Protestant 30%, Jewish 1%, Jehovah's Witnesses 2%, Buddhism 1%, Mormonism 1%, Hinduism 1%, and Non-religious 20%. The largest denominations are the Catholic Church with 456,598 adherents, the Episcopal Church with 19,377, the American Baptist Churches USA with 15,220, and the United Methodist Church with 6,901 adherents.

Rhode Island has had the highest proportion of Catholic residents of any state according to a study in 2000, mainly due to large Irish, Italian, and French-Canadian immigration in the past; recently, significant Portuguese and various Hispanic or Latino communities have also been established in the state. Though it has the highest overall Catholic percentage of any state, none of Rhode Island's individual counties ranks among the 10 most Catholic in the United States, as Catholics are evenly spread throughout the state.

According to the Public Religion Research Institute in 2020, 67% of the population were Christian, spread among evangelical and mainline Protestantism, and Roman Catholicism.

Rhode Island's Jewish community, centered in the Providence area, emerged during a wave of Jewish immigration predominantly from Eastern Europeans shtetls between 1880 and 1920. The presence of the Touro Synagogue in Newport, the oldest existing synagogue in the United States, emphasizes that these second-wave immigrants did not create Rhode Island's first Jewish community; a comparatively smaller wave of Spanish and Portuguese Jews immigrated to Newport during the colonial era.

The religiously unaffiliated since 2014 were 20% of the population, though the separate study by the Public Religion Research Institute determined the irreligious increased to 29% of the adult population.

Economy

The Rhode Island economy had a colonial base in fishing.

The Blackstone River Valley was a major contributor to the American Industrial Revolution. It was in Pawtucket that Samuel Slater set up Slater Mill in 1793, using the waterpower of the Blackstone River to power his cotton mill. For a while, Rhode Island was one of the leaders in textiles. However, with the Great Depression, most textile factories relocated to southern U.S. states. The textile industry still constitutes a part of the Rhode Island economy but does not have the same power.

Other important industries in Rhode Island's past included toolmaking, costume jewelry, and silverware. An interesting by-product of Rhode Island's industrial history is the number of abandoned factories, many of which are now condominiums, museums, offices, and low-income and elderly housing. Today, much of Rhode Island's economy is based on services, particularly healthcare and education, and still manufacturing to some extent. The state's nautical history continues in the 21st century in the form of nuclear submarine construction.

Per the 2013 American Communities Survey, Rhode Island has the highest paid elementary school teachers in the country, with an average salary of $75,028 (adjusted to inflation).

The headquarters of Citizens Financial Group, the 14th largest bank in the United States, is in Providence. The Fortune 500 companies CVS Caremark and Textron are based in Woonsocket and Providence, respectively. FM Global, GTECH Corporation, Hasbro, American Power Conversion, Nortek, and Amica Mutual Insurance are all Fortune 1000 companies based in Rhode Island.

Rhode Island's 2000 total gross state production was $46.18 billion (adjusted to inflation), placing it 45th in the nation. Its 2000 per capita personal income was $41,484 (adjusted to inflation), 16th in the nation. Rhode Island has the lowest level of energy consumption per capita of any state. Additionally, Rhode Island is rated as the 5th most energy efficient state in the country. In December 2012, the state's unemployment rate was 10.2%. This has gradually reduced to 3.5% in November 2019, however, the coronavirus pandemic brought the unemployment rate to a high of 18.1% in April 2020. This has since reduced to 10.5% in September 2020 and is projected to further decrease to 7% in October 2020.

Health services are Rhode Island's largest industry. Second is tourism, supporting 39,000 jobs, with tourism-related sales at $4.56 billion (adjusted to inflation) in the year 2000. The third-largest industry is manufacturing. Its industrial outputs are submarine construction, shipbuilding, costume jewelry, fabricated metal products, electrical equipment, machinery, and boatbuilding. Rhode Island's agricultural outputs are nursery stock, vegetables, dairy products, and eggs. The largest single product is milk, which in 2017 totaled $4,563,000 in sales.

Rhode Island's taxes were appreciably higher than neighboring states', because Rhode Island's income tax was based on 25% of the payer's federal income tax payment. Former Governor Donald Carcieri claimed the higher tax rate had an inhibitory effect on business growth in the state and called for reductions to increase the competitiveness of the state's business environment. In 2010, the Rhode Island General Assembly passed a new state income tax structure that Governor Carcieri signed into law on June 9, 2010. The income tax overhaul has made Rhode Island competitive with other New England states by lowering its maximum tax rate to 5.99% and reducing the number of tax brackets to three. The state's first income tax was enacted in 1971.

Largest employers
, Rhode Island's largest employers (excluding employees of municipalities) are:

Transportation

Bus

The Rhode Island Public Transit Authority (RIPTA) operates statewide intra- and intercity bus transport from its hubs at Kennedy Plaza in Providence, Pawtucket, and Newport. RIPTA bus routes serve 38 of Rhode Island's 39 cities and towns. (New Shoreham on Block Island is not served). RIPTA operates 58 routes, including daytime trolley service (using trolley-style replica buses) in Providence and Newport.

Ferry
From 2000 through 2008, RIPTA offered seasonal ferry service linking Providence and Newport (already connected by highway) funded by grant money from the United States Department of Transportation. Though the service was popular with residents and tourists, RIPTA was unable to continue after the federal funding ended. Service was discontinued . The service resumed in 2016 and has been successful. The privately run Block Island Ferry links Block Island with Newport and Narragansett with traditional and fast-ferry service, while the Prudence Island Ferry connects Bristol with Prudence Island. Private ferry services also link several Rhode Island communities with ports in Connecticut, Massachusetts, and New York.

Rail

The MBTA Commuter Rail's Providence/Stoughton Line links Providence and T. F. Green Airport with Boston's South Station, with an intermediate stop at Pawtucket/Central Falls and several stations in Massachusetts. The line was later extended southward to Wickford Junction, with service beginning April 23, 2012. The state hopes to extend the MBTA line to Kingston and Westerly, as well as explore the possibility of extending Connecticut's Shore Line East to T.F. Green Airport. Amtrak's Acela Express stops at Providence Station (the only Acela stop in Rhode Island), linking Providence to other cities in the Northeast Corridor. Amtrak's Northeast Regional service makes stops at Providence Station, Kingston, and Westerly.

Aviation

Rhode Island's primary airport for passenger and cargo transport is T. F. Green Airport in Warwick, though Rhode Islanders who wish to travel internationally on direct flights and those who seek a greater availability of flights and destinations often fly through Logan International Airport in Boston.

Limited access highways

Interstate 95 (I-95) runs southwest to northeast across the state, linking Rhode Island with other states along the East Coast. I-295 functions as a partial beltway encircling Providence to the west. I-195 provides a limited-access highway connection from Providence (and Connecticut and New York via I-95) to Cape Cod. Initially built as the easternmost link in the (now cancelled) extension of I-84 from Hartford, Connecticut, a portion of U.S. Route 6 (US 6) through northern Rhode Island is limited-access and links I-295 with downtown Providence.

Several Rhode Island highways extend the state's limited-access highway network. Route 4 is a major north–south freeway linking Providence and Warwick (via I-95) with suburban and beach communities along Narragansett Bay. Route 10 is an urban connector linking downtown Providence with Cranston and Johnston. Route 37 is an important east–west freeway through Cranston and Warwick and links I-95 with I-295. Route 99 links Woonsocket with Providence (via Route 146). Route 146 travels through the Blackstone Valley, linking Providence and I-95 with Worcester, Massachusetts and the Massachusetts Turnpike. Route 403 links Route 4 with Quonset Point.

Several bridges cross Narragansett Bay connecting Aquidneck Island and Conanicut Island to the mainland, most notably the Claiborne Pell Newport Bridge and the Jamestown-Verrazano Bridge.

Bicycle paths

The East Bay Bike Path stretches from Providence to Bristol along the eastern shore of Narragansett Bay, while the Blackstone River Bikeway will eventually link Providence and Worcester. In 2011, Rhode Island completed work on a marked on-road bicycle path through Pawtucket and Providence, connecting the East Bay Bike Path with the Blackstone River Bikeway, completing a  bicycle route through the eastern side of the state. The William C. O'Neill Bike Path (commonly known as the South County Bike Path) is an  path through South Kingstown and Narragansett. The  Washington Secondary Bike Path stretches from Cranston to Coventry, and the  Ten Mile River Greenway path runs through East Providence and Pawtucket.

Future
In late 2019, the Rhode Island Public Transit Authority released a draft of the Rhode Island Transit Master Plan, documenting and describing a variety of proposed improvements and additions to be made to the state's public transit network by 2040. Several different proposals were offered and still under consideration as of December 2020, including implementation of a bus rapid transit system, express bus routes, expansion of Amtrak and MBTA services throughout the state, and construction of a new light rail network through downtown Providence.

Media

Education

Primary and secondary schools

Colleges and universities

Rhode Island has several colleges and universities:

 Brown University
 Bryant University
 Community College of Rhode Island
 Johnson & Wales University
 Naval War College
 New England Institute of Technology
 Providence College
 Rhode Island College
 Rhode Island School of Design
 Roger Williams University
 Salve Regina University of Newport
 University of Rhode Island

Culture

Local accent

Some Rhode Islanders speak with the distinctive, non-rhotic, traditional Rhode Island accent linguists describe as a cross between New York City and Boston accents (e.g., "water" sounds like "watuh" ). Many Rhode Islanders distinguish a strong aw sound  (i.e., resist the cot–caught merger of Boston) much like one might hear in New Jersey or New York City; for example, the word coffee is pronounced . Rhode Islanders sometimes refer to drinking fountains as "bubblers", milkshakes as "cabinets", and overstuffed foot-long sandwiches (of whatever kind) as "grinders".

Food and beverages

Rhode Island, like the rest of New England, has a tradition of clam chowder. Both the white New England and the red Manhattan varieties are popular, but there is also a unique clear-broth chowder known as Rhode Island Clam Chowder available in many restaurants. A culinary tradition in Rhode Island is the clam cake (also known as a clam fritter outside of Rhode Island), a deep fried ball of buttery dough with chopped bits of clam inside. They are sold by the half-dozen or dozen in most seafood restaurants around the state, and the quintessential summer meal in Rhode Island is chowder and clam cakes.

The quahog is a large local clam usually used in a chowder. It is also ground and mixed with stuffing or spicy minced sausage, and then baked in its shell to form a stuffie. Calamari (squid) is sliced into rings and fried as an appetizer in most Italian restaurants, typically served Sicilian-style with sliced banana peppers and marinara sauce on the side. (In 2014, calamari became the official state appetizer.) Clams Casino originated in Rhode Island, invented by Julius Keller, the maître d' in the original Casino next to the seaside Towers in Narragansett. Clams Casino resemble the beloved stuffed quahog but are generally made with the smaller littleneck or cherrystone clam and are unique in their use of bacon as a topping.

The official state drink of Rhode Island is coffee milk, a beverage created by mixing milk with coffee syrup. This unique syrup was invented in the state and is sold in almost all Rhode Island supermarkets, as well as its bordering states. Johnnycakes have been a Rhode Island staple since Colonial times, made with corn meal and water then pan-fried much like pancakes.

Submarine sandwiches are called grinders throughout Rhode Island, and the Italian grinder, made with cold cuts such as ham, prosciutto, capicola, salami, and Provolone cheese, is especially popular. Linguiça or chouriço is a spicy Portuguese sausage often served with peppers and eaten with hearty bread.

Rhode Island state symbols

In popular culture
The Farrelly brothers and Seth MacFarlane depict Rhode Island in popular culture, often making comedic parodies of the state. MacFarlane's television series Family Guy is based in a fictional Rhode Island city named Quahog, and notable local events and celebrities are regularly lampooned. Peter Griffin is seen working at the Pawtucket brewery, and other state locations are mentioned.

The 1956 film High Society (starring Bing Crosby, Grace Kelly, and Frank Sinatra) was set in Newport, Rhode Island.

The 1974 film adaptation of The Great Gatsby was also filmed in Newport.

Jacqueline Bouvier and John F. Kennedy were married at St. Mary's church in Newport. Their reception took place at Hammersmith Farm, the Bouvier summer home in Newport.

Cartoonist Don Bousquet, a state icon, has made a career out of Rhode Island culture, drawing Rhode Island-themed gags in The Providence Journal and Yankee magazine. These cartoons have been reprinted in the Quahog series of paperbacks (I Brake for Quahogs, Beware of the Quahog, and The Quahog Walks Among Us.) Bousquet has also collaborated with humorist and Providence Journal columnist Mark Patinkin on two books: The Rhode Island Dictionary and The Rhode Island Handbook.

The 1998 film Meet Joe Black was filmed at Aldrich Mansion in the Warwick Neck area of Warwick.

Body of Proofs first season was filmed entirely in Rhode Island. The show premiered on March 29, 2011.

The 2007 Steve Carell and Dane Cook film Dan in Real Life was filmed in various coastal towns in the state. The sunset scene with the entire family on the beach takes place at Napatree Point.

Jersey Shore star Pauly D filmed part of his spin-off The Pauly D Project in his hometown of Johnston.

The Comedy Central cable television series Another Period is set in Newport during the Gilded Age.

Notable firsts in Rhode Island
Rhode Island has been the first in a number of initiatives. The Colony of Rhode Island and Providence Plantations enacted the first law prohibiting slavery in America on May 18, 1652.

The first act of armed rebellion in America against the British Crown was the boarding and burning of the Revenue Schooner HMS Gaspée in Narragansett Bay on June 10, 1772. The idea of a Continental Congress was first proposed at a town meeting in Providence on May 17, 1774. Rhode Island elected the first delegates (Stephen Hopkins and Samuel Ward) to the Continental Congress on June 15, 1774. The Rhode Island General Assembly created the first standing army in the colonies (1,500 men) on April 22, 1775. On June 15, 1775, the first naval engagement took place in the American Revolution between an American sloop commanded by Capt. Abraham Whipple and an armed tender of the British Frigate Rose. The tender was chased aground and captured. Rhode Island was the first Colony to declare independence from Britain on May 4, 1776.

Slater Mill in Pawtucket was the first commercially successful cotton-spinning mill with a fully mechanized power system in America and was the birthplace of the Industrial Revolution in the US. The oldest Fourth of July parade in the country is still held annually in Bristol, Rhode Island. The first Baptist church in America was founded in Providence in 1638. Ann Smith Franklin of the Newport Mercury was the first female newspaper editor in America (August 22, 1762). Touro Synagogue is the oldest synagogue in America, founded in Newport in 1763.

Pelham Street in Newport was the first in America to be illuminated by gaslight in 1806. The first strike in the United States in which women participated occurred in Pawtucket in 1824. Watch Hill has the nation's oldest flying horses carousel that has been in continuous operation since 1850. The motion picture machine was patented in Providence on April 23, 1867. The first lunch wagon in America was introduced in Providence in 1872. The first nine-hole golf course in America was completed in Newport in 1890. The first state health laboratory was established in Providence on September 1, 1894. The Rhode Island State House was the first building with an all-marble dome to be built in the United States (1895–1901). The first automobile race on a track was held in Cranston on September 7, 1896. The first automobile parade was held in Newport on September 7, 1899, on the grounds of Belcourt Castle.

Miscellaneous local culture
Rhode Island is nicknamed "The Ocean State", and the nautical nature of Rhode Island's geography pervades its culture. Newport Harbor, in particular, holds many pleasure boats. In the lobby of T. F. Green, the state's main airport, is a large life-sized sailboat, and the state's license plates depict an ocean wave or a sailboat.

The large number of beaches in Washington County lures many Rhode Islanders south for summer vacation.

The state constitution protects shore access, including swimming and gathering of seaweed. The 1982 Rhode Island Supreme Court decision in State v. Ibbison defines the end of private land as the mean high tide line, which is difficult to determine in day-to-day activities, and has resulted in beach access conflicts. Underfunding of the Rhode Island Coastal Resources Management Council has resulted in lax enforcement against encroachment on public access and building of illegal structures.

The state was notorious for organized crime activity from the 1950s into the 1990s when the Patriarca crime family held sway over most of New England from its Providence headquarters.

Rhode Islanders developed a unique style of architecture in the 17th century called the stone-ender.

Rhode Island is the only state to still celebrate Victory over Japan Day, which is officially named "Victory Day" but is sometimes referred to as "VJ Day". It is celebrated on the second Monday in August.

Nibbles Woodaway, more commonly referred to as "The Big Blue Bug", is a 58-foot-long termite mascot for a Providence extermination business. Since its construction in 1980, it has been featured in several movies and television shows, and has come to be recognized as a cultural landmark by many locals. In more recent times, the Big Blue Bug has been given a mask to remind locals and visitors to mask-up during the COVID-19 pandemic.

Sports

Professional
Rhode Island's only professional minor league team is the Providence Bruins ice hockey team of the American Hockey League, who are a top-level minor league affiliate of the Boston Bruins. They play in the Amica Mutual Pavilion in Providence and won the AHL's Calder Cup during the 1998–99 AHL season.

The Pawtucket Red Sox baseball team was a Triple-A International League affiliate of the Boston Red Sox from 1973 to 2020. They played at McCoy Stadium in Pawtucket and had won four league titles, the Governors' Cup, in 1973, 1984, 2012, and 2014. McCoy Stadium also has the distinction of being home to the longest professional baseball game ever played – 33 innings.

The Providence Reds were a hockey team that played in the Canadian-American Hockey League (CAHL) from 1926 to 1936, and the American Hockey League (AHL) from 1936 to 1977, the last season of which they played as the Rhode Island Reds. The team won the Calder Cup in 1938, 1940, 1949, and 1956. The Reds played at the Rhode Island Auditorium, on North Main Street in Providence, Rhode Island from 1926 through 1972, when the team affiliated with the New York Rangers and moved into the newly built Providence Civic Center. The team name came from the rooster known as the Rhode Island Red. They moved to New York in 1977, then to Connecticut in 1997, and are now called the Hartford Wolf Pack.

The Reds are the oldest continuously operating minor-league hockey franchise in North America, having fielded a team in one form or another since 1926 in the CAHL. It is also the only AHL franchise to have never missed a season. The AHL returned to Providence in 1992 in the form of the Providence Bruins.

Before the great expansion of athletic teams all over the country, Providence and Rhode Island in general played a great role in supporting teams. The Providence Grays won the first World Championship in baseball history in 1884. The team played their home games at the old Messer Street Field in Providence. The Grays played in the National League from 1878 to 1885. They defeated the New York Metropolitans of the American Association in a best of five-game series at the Polo Grounds in New York. Providence won three straight games to become the first champions in major league baseball history. Babe Ruth played for the minor league Providence Grays of 1914 and hit his only official minor league home run for them before the Grays' parent club, the Boston Red Stockings, recalled him.

The now-defunct professional football team the Providence Steam Roller won the 1928 NFL title. They played in a 10,000 person stadium called the Cycledrome. The Providence Steamrollers played in the Basketball Association of America which became the National Basketball Association.

Rhode Island is also home to a top semi-professional soccer club, the Rhode Island Reds, which compete in the National premier soccer league, in the fourth division of U.S. Soccer.

Rhode Island is home to one top level non-minor league team, the Rhode Island Rebellion rugby league team, a semi-professional rugby league team that competes in the USA Rugby League, the Top Competition in the United States for the Sport of Rugby League. The Rebellion play their home games at Classical High School in Providence.

Current professional teams

Current semi-professional teams

Collegiate and amateur sports

There are four NCAA Division I schools in Rhode Island. All four schools compete in different conferences. The Brown University Bears compete in the Ivy League, the Bryant University Bulldogs compete in the America East Conference, the Providence College Friars compete in the Big East Conference, and the University of Rhode Island Rams compete in the Atlantic 10 Conference. Three of the schools' football teams compete in the Football Championship Subdivision, the second-highest level of college football in the United States. Brown plays FCS football in the Ivy League, Bryant plays FCS football in the Big South Conference before that league merges its football operations with those of the Ohio Valley Conference in 2023, and Rhode Island plays FCS football in CAA Football, the technically separate football league of the Colonial Athletic Association. All four Division I schools in the state compete in an intrastate all-sports competition known as the Ocean State Cup, with Bryant winning the most recent cup in 2011–12 academic year.

From 1930 to 1983, America's Cup races were sailed off Newport, and the extreme-sport X Games and Gravity Games were founded and hosted in the state's capital city.

The International Tennis Hall of Fame is in Newport at the Newport Casino, site of the first U.S. National Championships in 1881. The Hall of Fame and Museum were established in 1954 by Jimmy Van Alen as "a shrine to the ideals of the game".

Rhode Island is also home to the headquarters of the governing body for youth rugby league in the United States, the American Youth Rugby League Association or AYRLA. The AYRLA has started the first-ever Rugby League youth competition in Providence Middle Schools, a program at the RI Training School, in addition to starting the first High School Competition in the US in Providence Public High School.

Government

The capital of Rhode Island is Providence. The state's governor is Daniel McKee (D), and the lieutenant governor is Sabina Matos (D). Gina Raimondo became Rhode Island's first female governor with a plurality of the vote in the November 2014 state elections. Its United States senators are Jack Reed (D) and Sheldon Whitehouse (D). Rhode Island's two United States representatives are David Cicilline (D-1) and Jim Langevin (D-2). See congressional districts map. Rhode Island is one of a few states that do not have an official governor's residence. See List of Rhode Island Governors.

The state legislature is the Rhode Island General Assembly, consisting of the 75-member House of Representatives and the 38-member Senate. The Democratic Party dominates both houses of the bicameral body; the Republican Party's presence is minor in the state government, with Republicans holding a handful of seats in both the Senate and House of Representatives.

Elections

Rhode Island's population barely crosses the threshold beyond the minimum of three for additional votes in both the federal House of Representatives and Electoral College; it is well represented relative to its population, with the eighth-highest number of electoral votes and second-highest number of House Representatives per resident. Based on its area, Rhode Island has the highest density of electoral votes of any state.

Federally, Rhode Island is a reliably Democratic state during presidential elections, usually supporting the Democratic presidential nominee. The state voted for the Republican presidential candidate until 1908. Since then, it has voted for the Republican nominee for president seven times, and the Democratic nominee 17 times. The last 16 presidential elections in Rhode Island have resulted in the Democratic Party winning the Ocean State's Electoral College votes 12 times. In the 1980 presidential election, Rhode Island was one of six states to vote against Republican Ronald Reagan. Reagan was the last Republican to win any of the state's counties in a Presidential election until Donald Trump won Kent County in 2016. In 1988, George H. W. Bush won over 40% of the state's popular vote, something no Republican has done since.

Rhode Island was the Democrats' leading state in 1960, 1964, 1968, 1988 and 2000, and second-best in 1968, 1972, 1996, and 2004. Rhode Island's most one-sided Presidential election result was in 1964, with over 80% of Rhode Island's votes going for Lyndon B. Johnson. In 2004, Rhode Island gave John Kerry more than a 20-percentage-point margin of victory (the third-highest of any state), with 59.4% of its vote. All but three of Rhode Island's 39 cities and towns voted for the Democratic candidate. The exceptions were East Greenwich, West Greenwich, and Scituate. In 2008, Rhode Island gave Barack Obama a 28-percentage-point margin of victory (the third-highest of any state), with 63% of its vote. All but one of Rhode Island's 39 cities and towns voted for the Democratic candidate (the exception being Scituate).

In a 2020 study, Rhode Island was ranked as the 19th easiest state for citizens to vote in.

Legislation and taxes
Rhode Island is one of 21 states that have abolished capital punishment; it was second do so, just after Michigan, and carried out its last execution in the 1840s. Rhode Island was the second to last state to make prostitution illegal. Until November 2009 Rhode Island law made prostitution legal provided it took place indoors. In a 2009 study Rhode Island was listed as the 9th safest state in the country.

In 2011, Rhode Island became the third state in the United States to pass legislation to allow the use of medical marijuana. On May 25, 2022, Rhode Island fully legalized recreational use of marijuana, becoming the nineteenth state to do so. Additionally, the Rhode Island General Assembly passed legislation that allowed civil unions which Governor Lincoln Chafee signed into law on July 2, 2011. Rhode Island became the eighth state to fully recognize either same-sex marriage or civil unions. Same-sex marriage became legal on May 2, 2013, and took effect August 1.

Rhode Island has some of the highest taxes in the country, particularly its property taxes, ranking seventh in local and state taxes, and sixth in real estate taxes.

Notable people

 Thomas Angell (1618–1694) – co-founder of the Colony of Rhode Island and Providence Plantations
 Joshua Babcock (1707–1783) – physician, American Revolution general, state Supreme Court justice, and postmaster
 John Clarke (1609–1676) – Baptist minister, co-founder of the Colony of Rhode Island and Providence Plantations, author of its influential charter, and a leading advocate of religious freedom in America
 William Coddington (1601–1678) – magistrate of the Colony of Rhode Island and Providence Plantations, Judge of Portsmouth, Judge of Newport, Governor of Portsmouth and Newport, Deputy Governor of the entire colony, and governor of the colony
 William Ellery (1727–1820) – a signer of the United States Declaration of Independence as a representative of Rhode Island
 Samuel Gorton (1593–1677) – settled Warwick
 Nathanael Greene (1742–1786) – Continental Army officer, considered George Washington's most gifted officer
 Esek Hopkins (1718–1802) – Commander in Chief of the Continental Navy during the American Revolutionary War
 Stephen Hopkins (1707–1785) – Governor of Rhode Island, RI Supreme Court justice, Signatory of the Declaration of Independence
 Anne Hutchinson (1591–1643) – early settler of Newport, the catalyst of the Antinomian Controversy
 H. P. Lovecraft (1890–1937) – author
 Oliver Hazard Perry (1785–1819) naval commander and hero of the War of 1812, the best-known and most prominent member of the Perry family naval dynasty
 Samuel Slater (1768–1835) – industrialist, "father of the industrial revolution"
 Gilbert Stuart (1755–1828) – painter, one of America's foremost portraitists
 James Mitchell Varnum (1748–1789) – general in the Continental Army during the American Revolutionary War
 Samuel Ward (1725–1776) – Supreme Court Justice, Governor of the Colony of Rhode Island and Providence Plantations, and a delegate to the Continental Congress
 Samuel Ward Jr. (1756–1832) – American Revolutionary War soldier and delegate to the secessionist Hartford Convention
 Roger Williams (1603–1684) – founder of the Colony of Rhode Island and Providence Plantations, influential author, considered the first proponent of separation of church and state
 Abraham Whipple (1733–1819) – Continental Navy commander-in-chief

See also
 Index of Rhode Island-related articles
 Outline of Rhode Island

Notes

Citations

General bibliography

Primary sources
 Dwight, Timothy. Travels Through New England and New York (circa 1800) 4 vol. (1969) Online at: vol 1 ; vol 2; vol 3; vol 4
 McPhetres, S. A. A political manual for the campaign of 1868, for use in the New England states, containing the population and latest election returns of every town (1868) 
 Rhode Island's Geography and Climate

Secondary sources
 Adams, James Truslow. The Founding of New England (1921)
 Adams, James Truslow. Revolutionary New England, 1691–1776 (1923)
 Adams, James Truslow. New England in the Republic, 1776–1850 (1926)
 Andrews, Charles M. The Fathers of New England: A Chronicle of the Puritan Commonwealths (1919). Short survey by leading scholar.
 Axtell, James, ed. The American People in Colonial New England (1973), new social history
 Brewer, Daniel Chauncey. Conquest of New England by the Immigrant (1926).
 Coleman, Peter J. The Transformation of Rhode Island, 1790–1860 (1963)
 Conforti, Joseph A. Imagining New England: Explorations of Regional Identity from the Pilgrims to the Mid-Twentieth Century (2001)
 Dennison, George M. The Dorr War: Republicanism on Trial, 1831–1861 (1976)
 Hall, Donald, ed. Encyclopedia of New England (2005)
 Karlsen, Carol F. The Devil in the Shape of a Woman: Witchcraft in Colonial New England (1998)
 Lovejoy, David S. Rhode Island Politics and the American Revolution, 1760–1776 (1969)
 McLaughlin, William. Rhode Island: A Bicentennial History (1976)
 Moondancer & Strong Woman "Cultural History of the Native Peoples of Southern New England". Bauu Press. (2007).
 Palfrey, John Gorham. History of New England  (5 vol. 1859–90)
 
 Sletcher, Michael. New England. (2004).
 Stephenson, Nathaniel Wright. Nelson W. Aldrich, a Leader in American Politics (1930).
 WPA. Guide to Rhode Island (1939).
 Zimmerman, Joseph F. The New England Town Meeting: Democracy in Action . (1999)

External links

 
 State of Rhode Island Government website
 Energy & Environmental Data for Rhode Island
 USGS real-time, geographic, and other scientific resources of Rhode Island 
 U.S. Census Bureau Quickfacts: Rhode Island
 Rhode Island laws
 Scituate Art Festival
 USDA Rhode Island State Facts
  — Detailed Historical Article 
 Indian Place Names
 
 Rhode Island State Databases – Annotated list of searchable databases produced by Rhode Island state agencies and compiled by the Government Documents Roundtable of the American Library Association.
 Rhode Island State Guide from the Library of Congress
 Rhode Island State Archives Catalog for further information

 
1790 establishments in the United States
New England states
Northeastern United States
States and territories established in 1790
States of the East Coast of the United States
States of the United States
Contiguous United States